More Light is the tenth studio album by Scottish rock band Primal Scream, released on 13 May 2013.
The single "It's Alright, It's OK" received airplay on national stations including BBC Radio 2, BBC Radio 6 Music and Absolute Radio and on music channel MTV Rocks, whilst it has also been played on a number of smaller stations including 106.9FM WHCR and Kingstown Radio. It references influential The Gun Club singer Jeffrey Lee Pierce with a take on his song "Goodbye Johnny" and use of the track title "Walking with the Beast". This is their first album since Give Out But Don't Give Up (1994) to not feature bassist Mani.

Critical reception

More Light received highly positive reactions from critics and is perhaps their most critically acclaimed album since XTRMNTR. On Metacritic, the album has a score of 77 out of 100, based on 29 reviews. Neil McCormick of The Daily Telegraph gave a positive review of the album, describing it as "mesmerising" and containing "big, monstrous, mantra-like, psychedelic grooves". He went on to add that More Light should do much to restore Primal Scream's reputation as one of the country's most creative and ambitious rock bands. The music is dense yet uplifting, creating its own tensions with Gillespie's dark, stream-of-consciousness lyrics. Songs like "2013", "Culturecide", "Tenement Kid" and "Walking with the Beast" convey an impression of a highly-strung, heartfelt assault on the inequities of the modern world, before building to the euphoric gospel release of closing track "It's Alright, It's OK".

Artwork
The artwork, designed by Scottish artist Jim Lambie, is based on the artwork from Scottish musician Momus's 1988 album, Tender Pervert.

Track listing
All tracks composed by Andrew Innes and Bobby Gillespie; except where indicated
More Light

Extra Light

Personnel 
Primal Scream
 Bobby Gillespie – vocals, tambourine, handclaps, mellotron, electric piano, drums, percussion
 Andrew Innes – electric, acoustic, and twelve-string guitars, bass guitar, six-string bass, keyboards, electric sitar, synthesizer, autoharp, dulcimer, drones
 Martin Duffy – keyboards
 Darrin Mooney – drums, percussion

Additional personnel
 Fred Adams – trumpet
 Marshall Allen – alto saxophone
 Jay Bellerose – drums
 Nicky Brown – vocal arrangements
 Barrie Cadogan – guitar, backing vocals
 Davey Chegwidden – drums, guiro, percussion, tom-toms
 Keefus Cianca – bells, piano
 Matthew Cooper – design
 Rich Costey – mixing
 Jason Falkner – bass guitar, six-string bass, guitar, synthesizer, engineer
 Geo Gabriel – backing vocals
 Michael Harris – engineering
 Sharlene Hector – backing vocals
 David Henderson – guitar
 Max Heyes – engineering
 David Holmes – engineering, producer
 Jim Hunt – saxophone, flute
 Eric Islip – engineering
 Woody Jackson – engineering, guitar, orchestration
 Sam Johnston – engineering
 Chris Kasych – Pro-Tools
 Jim Lambie – sleeve art
 Brendan Lynch – production, engineering, mixing
 Marco Nelson – bass guitar
 Niall O'Brien – photography
 Ladonna Harley Peters – background vocals
 Robert Plant – backing vocals
 Noel Scott – alto saxophone, tenor saxophone
 Kevin Shields – guitar
 Todd Simon – trumpet
 Paul Stanborough – engineering
 Mark Stewart – backing vocals, whistle
 Steve Tavaglione – alto saxophone, tenor saxophone
 Danny Ray Thompson – baritone saxophone
 Valente Torrez – engineering
 Masa Tsuzki – engineering
 The Unloved – backing vocals
 Tracy Wannomae – alto saxophone

References

External links

More Light at YouTube (streamed copy where licensed)

2013 albums
Primal Scream albums
Albums recorded at Electro-Vox Recording Studios